Protopidius is a genus of beetles in the family Carabidae, containing the following species:

 Protopidius brevis Lecordier, 1990
 Protopidius bruneaui Lecordier & Girard, 1987
 Protopidius congoanus Basilewsky, 1949
 Protopidius obesus Lecordier & Girard, 1987
 Protopidius strictus Lecordier, 1990

References

Licininae